Norwich City railway station was located in Norwich, Norfolk, England and was closed in 1969.

History

The station was opened in 1882 by the Lynn and Fakenham Railway, and later became the southern terminus of the Midland and Great Northern Joint Railway (MG&N) line from Melton Constable. The station became well-used, with services to Cromer and through-carriages to a range of destinations including Peterborough and Leicester.

The station was badly bombed in the Baedeker raids of 1942  when the main building was largely destroyed. The station was further damaged when a badly damaged USAF B24 Liberator bomber was deliberately crashed there to avoid greater loss of life. Thereafter, the station operated from "temporary" buildings constructed on the site. It was closed to passengers on 2 March 1959 along with most of the Midland & Great Northern system, although the station remained in use for goods traffic until 1969.

Location
The old Norwich City station stood where a roundabout is situated on the Inner link road A147, which links Barn Road with St Crispins Road close to  Anglia Square. The present Norwich railway station is about 1 mile away, to the southeast.

Recent news and developments
The amateur group Friends of Norwich City Station  (FONCS) has been set up to preserve what is left of the station and surrounding buildings. Current work is focused on the platform area. The Platform 1 wall has been discovered and the bay area has been cleared of undergrowth. The hope for the future is to uncover all the railway related parts to the area and turn it into a memorial garden. They are also documenting all those who served the station. Interpretation boards will be erected, some illustrating old photographs of the site. M&GN benches are hoped to also accompany these.

Former services

See also
 Norwich Thorpe railway station
 Norwich Victoria railway station
 List of closed railway stations in Norfolk

References

External links
 Norwich City station on navigable 1946 O. S. map
 Friends of Norwich City Station (FONCS) Flickr Group

Disused railway stations in Norfolk
Railway stations in Great Britain opened in 1882
Railway stations in Great Britain closed in 1959
Former Midland and Great Northern Joint Railway stations
Transport in Norwich
Buildings and structures in Norwich